Angst is the seventeenth album by Klaus Schulze. It was originally released in 1984, and in 2005 was the fourteenth Schulze album reissued by Revisited Records. It is the soundtrack for the 1983 Austrian film of the same name. "Freeze" featured in the 1986 film Manhunter.

Track listing
All tracks composed by Klaus Schulze.

References

External links
 Angst at the official site of Klaus Schulze
 

Klaus Schulze albums
1984 soundtrack albums
Electronica soundtracks
Horror film soundtracks